Nicolás Andereggen (born 22 September 1999) is an Argentine professional footballer who plays as a forward for Greek Super League 2 club Kifisia.

Career
Andereggen got his debut for Union at the age of only 16 on 7 November 2015, which made him the youngest player ever to play in the Argentine Primera División at the time.

On 15 January 2019, Unión Santa Fe loaned out Andereggen to Swiss club FC Zürich until the end of 2019 with an option to sign him on a permanent deal.   He spent majority of his loan with Zürich's Under-21 team which plays in the third-tier Swiss Promotion League.

Personal life
Andereggen is of Swiss descent, and holds a Swiss passport.

References

External links
 

1999 births
Living people
Argentine footballers
Argentine expatriate footballers
Argentine people of Swiss descent
Association football forwards
People from San Jerónimo Department
Sportspeople from Santa Fe Province
Unión de Santa Fe footballers
FC Zürich players
Club Atlético Alvarado players
O.F. Ierapetra F.C. players
Argentine Primera División players
Swiss Super League players
Swiss Promotion League players
Super League Greece 2 players
Argentine expatriate sportspeople in Switzerland
Argentine expatriate sportspeople in Greece
Expatriate footballers in Switzerland
Expatriate footballers in Greece